Reginald ""Reg Jukes was a professional rugby league footballer who played in the 1930s and 1940s. He played at club level for the Featherstone Rovers (Heritage № 177).

Playing career
Reginald Jukes made his début for the Featherstone Rovers on Saturday 18 November 1939.

Genealogical information
Reginald Jukes was the older brother of the rugby league footballer who played in the 1940s and 1950s, for the Featherstone Rovers (Heritage № 305); Albert Jukes.

References

External links
Search for "Jukes" at rugbyleagueproject.org

Featherstone Rovers players
Place of birth missing
Place of death missing
English rugby league players
Year of birth missing
Year of death missing